The black-spotted barbet (Capito niger) is a species of bird in the family Capitonidae, the New World barbets. It is found in Brazil, the Guianas, and Venezuela.

Taxonomy and systematics

Until the late 20th century, the black-spotted barbet was often considered to be a subspecies of the widespread gilded barbet (Capito auratus). The black-spotted, gilded, and brown-chested barbets (C. brunneipectus) apparently form a superspecies.

As it is currently defined, the black-spotted barbet is monotypic.

Description

It is intricately colored, with much variation in the richness of the colors. The adult male has a red forehead, a yellowish crown and nape, and a black band from the lores to the nape. The nape has dusky streaks. Its upperside is black; its mantle is outlined yellowish and it has yellowish wingbars. Its throat is red, the breast and belly yellow, and the flanks yellow with an olive tinge and black streaks. The adult female is similarly colored but more heavily marked; its upperparts have pale flecks on the black and the breast and belly are spotted or streaked. The immatures are similar to the adults but duller.

Distribution and habitat

The black-spotted barbet is found in the eastern parts of Venezuela's Bolívar and Delta Amacuro states, the three countries of the Guianas, and the Brazilian states of Roraima, Pará, and Amapá north of the Amazon River. It inhabits the interiors of a variety of forest types including terra firme, riparian, and várzea. It also uses the forest edges and more open terrain such as gardens and plantations.

Behavior

Feeding

Though little is known about the black-spotted barbet's diet and foraging habits, they are assumed to be similar to those of the gilded barbet.

Breeding

The black-spotted barbet breeds from September to May and possibly to July. The female lays three or four eggs and both parents incubate them.

Vocalization

The black-spotted barbet's song is "double, sometimes single, low 'wú-woot' notes" . Its call is a scratchy croak .

Status

The IUCN has assessed the black-spotted barbet as being of Least Concern. Though its population has not been quantified, the species is uncommon to widespread in its range and occurs in several protected areas.

References

External links
Black-spotted Barbet videos on the Internet Bird Collection
Stamp (for Netherlands Antilles) Bird Series
Black-spotted Barbet photo gallery VIREO Photo-High Res
Photo-Medium Res; Article nashvillezoo.org—"Ramphastidae"
Photo-High Res; Article oiseaux

black-spotted barbet
Birds of the Guianas
Birds of the Brazilian Amazon
black-spotted barbet
Taxonomy articles created by Polbot